Calling the Tune was a 1936 British musical drama film directed by Reginald Denham and Thorold Dickinson and starring Adele Dixon, Sally Gray and Sam Livesey. It was based on a play written by the Irish MP and novelist, Justin Huntly McCarthy first published in 1913. It was made at Ealing Studios The film's sets were designed by the art director R. Holmes Paul.

Cast
 Adele Dixon as Julia Harbord  
 Sally Gray as Margaret Gordon  
 Sam Livesey as Bob Gordon  
 Eliot Makeham as Stephen Harbord  
 Donald Wolfit as Dick Finlay  
 Clifford Evans as Peter Mallory  
 Lewis Casson as John Mallory  
 Ronald Simpson as Bramwell  
 H. F. Maltby as Stubbins  
 Robb Wilton as Jenkins 
 Reginald Forsyth as himself 
 Charles Penrose as himself 
 George Robey as himself 
 Students of the R.A.D.A. as Themselves
 Sir Henry Wood as himself
 Pat Fitzpatrick as Boy  
 Cedric Hardwicke as himself

References

Bibliography
 Low, Rachael. Filmmaking in 1930s Britain. George Allen & Unwin, 1985.
 Wood, Linda. British Films, 1927-1939. British Film Institute, 1986.

External links

1936 films
British musical drama films
1930s musical drama films
Films directed by Reginald Denham
Ealing Studios films
Films set in London
British black-and-white films
1936 drama films
1930s English-language films
1930s British films